is a railway station on the Ōu Main Line in the city of Yuzawa, Akita Prefecture,  Japan, operated by JR East.

Lines
Kami-Yuzawa Station is served by the Ōu Main Line, and is located 207.1 km from the terminus of the line at Fukushima Station.

Station layout
The station consists of one side platform serving a single bi-directional line. The station is unattended.

History
Kami-Yuzawa Station opened on November 28, 1956, as a station on the Japan National Railways (JNR). It has been unattended since December 1979. The station was absorbed into the JR East network upon the privatization of the JNR on April 1, 1987.

Passenger statistics
In fiscal 2007, the last year for which published statistics are available,  the station was used by an average of 41 passengers daily (boarding passengers only).

Surrounding area
The deeply wooded and remote area is known for its romantic attractions and hotels .

See also
List of railway stations in Japan

References

External links

 JR East Station information 

Railway stations in Japan opened in 1956
Railway stations in Akita Prefecture
Ōu Main Line
Yuzawa, Akita